Erik Gustafsson (born 15 December 1988) is a Swedish professional ice hockey defenceman and captain for Luleå HF of the Swedish Hockey League (SHL).

Playing career
Gustafsson played in the youth ranks of Timrå IK before enrolling at Northern Michigan University in 2007. He spent three years in college, before signing a three-year, entry-level contract with the Philadelphia Flyers on 31 March 2010. Gustafsson made his NHL debut on 26 February 2011, against the Ottawa Senators, subbing for Chris Pronger, who was out with a bruised right hand.

Gustafsson scored his first career NHL goal against Ryan Miller of the Buffalo Sabres on 16 February 2012.

Following the 2013–14 NHL season, Gustafsson signed with Avangard Omsk of the Kontinental Hockey League. In the 2014–15 season, Gustafsson immediately established himself amongst the blueline with Omsk, finishing second among defenceman with 22 points in 56 games.

Despite early interest in the off-season from the NHL, on 17 July 2015, Gustafsson left Omsk as a free agent to sign a one-year contract with Swiss club, Kloten Flyers of the NLA. After one year in Switzerland, he returned to Avangard Omsk, signing in May 2016.

On 2 May 2018, Gustafsson returned to his native Sweden in agreeing to a four-year contract with Luleå HF. In making his debut in the SHL in the 2018–19 season, Gustafsson as captain led Luleå HF from the blueline, playing top-pairing minutes in recording 6 goals and 27 points in 49 games. In the playoffs, Gustafsson increased his scoring rate with 9 in 10 games. He was awarded the Salming Trophy as the SHL's best defenceman to conclude the season.

Career statistics

Regular season and playoffs

International

Awards and achievements

References

External links
 

1988 births
Living people
Adirondack Phantoms players
AHCA Division I men's ice hockey All-Americans
Avangard Omsk players
EHC Kloten players
Ice hockey players at the 2018 Winter Olympics
Luleå HF players
Northern Michigan Wildcats men's ice hockey players
Olympic ice hockey players of Sweden
Philadelphia Flyers players
Swedish ice hockey defencemen
Undrafted National Hockey League players